The Madrid System, also known as the Madrid Protocol or simply Madrid, is the primary international system for facilitating the registration of trademarks in multiple jurisdictions around the world. It was established pursuant to the multilateral treaties Madrid Agreement Concerning the International Registration of Marks of 1891 and the Protocol Relating to the Madrid Agreement (1989), which has been the sole governing treaty since 2016. 

The Madrid System provides a centrally administered system for obtaining multiple trademark registrations in separate jurisdictions; it does not create a single unified registration across different jurisdictions, as in the case of the European Union trademark system. Rather, applicants file a single international trademark application and pay one set of fees to apply for protection in any or all countries that are members of the system; each country has discretion to grant the application. Once the trademark authority of a designated country grants protection, the mark is protected in that jurisdiction just as if that office had registered it.

The Madrid System is administered by the International Bureau of the United Nations World Intellectual Property Organization (WIPO) in Geneva, Switzerland. As of February 2023, the Madrid System consists of 114 members covering 130 countries; known collectively as the Madrid Union, they represent more than 80% of world trade.

History and development 

The Madrid system comprises two treaties; the Madrid Agreement Concerning the International Registration of Marks, which was concluded in 1891, and entered into force in 1892, and the Protocol Relating to the Madrid Agreement, which came into operation on 1 April 1996. The Madrid Agreement and Madrid Protocol were adopted at diplomatic conferences held in Madrid, Spain.

The Madrid Agreement was originally intended to provide for an international registration system, but did not achieve this for two significant reasons:

 The lack of international acceptance. Many non-member countries, including the United Kingdom, the United States, and Central American, South American and Asian countries, such as Japan, were not adherents, which undermined recognition of the system as a truly "international" regime. Significantly, many of these countries represent the largest numbers of trademark filings and registrations in the world; and
 The mere forwarding by the International Bureau of a uniform application to member countries, rather than the registration of the applicable trademark in the national trademark registers, precludes an actual "registration" system.

Some of the large trading nations like the United States, Japan, and Canada, which have a large number of filings at the national level, did not join the Madrid Agreement due to another perceived flaw in the system:  if the home registration upon which an international registration was based came under 'central attack', the international registration would be cancelled or limited to the same extent that the home registration was cancelled or limited.

During 1966 and 1967, attempts were made to address this issue by establishing a new treaty that would reflect the need of the times rather than the world of the 1890s when the agreement was adopted. This led to the drafting of the Trademark Registration Treaty (TRT) which was adopted in Vienna in 1973, and entered into effect in 1980, with five contracting states, namely, Burkina Faso, Congo, Gabon, Soviet Union and Togo. In the absence of more accessions to the TRT and the low number of registrations since its inception, it was clear that the TRT was unlikely to supplant the Madrid Agreement.

As the realization of the introduction of a multi-jurisdictional (or at least pan-European) European Community Trade Mark (CTM) approached, the relevancy of the Madrid system came under scrutiny. Pressure increased on WIPO to maintain its relevance and strengthen the agreement by increasing membership, possibly through amendments. This culminated in the introduction of the Madrid Protocol, pursuant to which a CTM registration could be a 'foundation' or 'home' registration upon which an international registration could then be established. This mechanism is referred to as a "linking provision." The Protocol, after considerable lobbying efforts by WIPO, was signed by many countries, including most of the present members of the Madrid Agreement, and some countries that are members of the European Union, but were not members of the Madrid Agreement.  The Protocol entered into force on December 1, 1995 and became operative on April 1, 1996.

Many countries have needed to modify or consider modifying their trademark laws in order to adhere to the Protocol, in addition to the modifications required by GATT-TRIPS/WTO.

In Europe, resistance to the Protocol was brought by trademark attorneys who were afraid of losing business because a Community Trade Mark application could be filed directly through the Madrid Protocol process.  In the United States, the proposal bogged down due to a trademark dispute between two businesses who were heavy campaign contributors to certain Congressmen, followed by a repeated reshuffling of the Senate due to elections and a subsequent defection of a Republican senator. The treaty was eventually ratified during the presidency of George W. Bush. With the accension of the U.S. and EU to the Madrid Protocol on November 2, 2003, and October 1, 2004, respectively, most major trading jurisdictions have joined the Madrid system.

On 31 July 2015, Algeria deposited its instrument of accession and acceded to the Madrid Protocol on 31 October 2015; as Algeria was the last member of the Madrid system to adhere to the protocol, the protocol became effective across the entire Madrid system.

Members 

Adherence to the convention or the protocol includes membership of the "Madrid Union." , there are 104 members made out of 120 countries. The original treaty has 55 members, all of which are also party to the protocol (when Algeria joined the Madrid Protocol on October 31, 2015, all of the members of the Madrid Agreement were also members of the Madrid Protocol and many of the aspects of the Madrid Agreement ceased to have any practical effect).  The term 'Madrid Union' can be used to describe those jurisdictions party to either the agreement or the protocol (or both).

The protocol has been in operation since 1996 and has 100 members making it more popular than the agreement, which has been in operation for more than 110 years and has 55 members. The primary reason the protocol is more popular than the agreement is that the protocol introduced a number of changes to the Madrid system which significantly enhanced its usefulness to trademark owners.

For example, under the protocol it is possible to obtain an international registration based on a pending trademark application, so that a trademark owner can effectively apply for international registration concurrently, or immediately after, filing an application in a member jurisdiction. By comparison, the agreement requires that the trademark owner already holds an existing registration in a member jurisdiction, which may often take many months and sometimes years to obtain in the first place. In addition, the agreement does not provide the option to 'convert' international registrations which have been 'centrally attacked.'

Advantages 

The Madrid system provides a mechanism whereby a trademark owner who has an existing trademark application or registration (known as the 'basic application' or 'basic registration') in a member jurisdiction may obtain an 'international registration' for their trademark from the WIPO.  The trademark owner may then extend the protection afforded to the international registration to one or more member jurisdictions, a process known as 'designation'. A useful feature of the Madrid system is that this protection may generally be extended to additional jurisdictions at any time, such that international trade mark protection can be extended to new jurisdictions which subsequently join Madrid, or to such other jurisdictions as the trade mark owner may choose.

In basic terms, the primary advantage of the Madrid system is that it allows a trademark owner to obtain trademark protection in any or all member states by filing one application in one jurisdiction with one set of fees, and make any changes (e.g. changes of name or address) and renew registration across all applicable jurisdictions through a single administrative process and the payment of a single fee.

Disadvantages 

One disadvantage of the Madrid system is that any refusal, withdrawal or cancellation of the basic application or basic registration within five years of the registration date of the international registration will lead to the refusal, withdrawal or cancellation of the international registration to the same extent. For example, if a basic application covers 'clothing, headgear and footwear,' and 'headgear' is then deleted from the basic application (for whatever reason), 'headgear' will also be deleted from the international application. Therefore, the protection afforded by the international registration in each designated member jurisdiction will extend only to 'clothing and footwear.' If the basic application is rejected as a whole, the international registration would also be totally refused.

The process of attacking the basic application or basic registration for this purpose is generally known as 'central attack.' Under the Madrid Protocol, the effects of a successful central attack can be mitigated by transforming the international registration into a series of applications in each jurisdiction designated by the international registration, a process known as 'transformation.' Although transformation is an expensive option of last resort, the resulting applications will receive the registration date of the international registration as their filing date.

In 1997, less than half of a percent of international registrations were canceled as a result of central attack.

The cost savings which usually result from using the Madrid system may be negated by the requirement to use local agents in the applicable jurisdiction if any problems arise.

See also 

 Singapore Treaty on the Law of Trademarks
 International (Nice) Classification of Goods and Services
 World Intellectual Property Organization

Notes

References

External links 

 WIPO Madrid system homepage
 Madrid Agreement Concerning the International Registration of Marks in the WIPO Lex database — official website of WIPO.
 The full text of the Madrid Agreement Concerning the International Registration of Marks (as amended on September 28, 1979) .
 Protocol Relating to the Madrid Agreement Concerning the International Registration of Marks in the WIPO Lex database — official website of WIPO.
 The full text of the Protocol Relating to the Madrid Agreement Concerning the International Registration of Marks (as amended on November 12, 2007) .
 Brief Overview Of Madrid Protocol
 Overview of Madrid Protocol with list of member states as of May 2023
 International Trade Marks Association (INTA) Madrid Protocol homepage
  madridextension.com Site explaining the Madrid Extension of a Trademark Application

Intellectual property law
Intellectual property treaties
Trademark law
World Intellectual Property Organization treaties